Hampton Sidney Thomas (November 3, 1837 – May 21, 1899) was a United States soldier who fought with the Union Army as a major in the 1st Pennsylvania Cavalry during the American Civil War. He received his country's highest award for valor, the Medal of Honor, for his "conspicuous gallantry" on April 5, 1865, in the Battle of Amelia Springs, Virginia during which he captured an artillery battery and several enemy flags while also helping to destroy a wagon train of the Confederate States Army. The award was conferred on January 15, 1894.

Formative years
Born in Quakertown, Pennsylvania, on November 3, 1837, Hampton Sidney Thomas was a son of David Thomas, M.D. and Jesse (Baker) Thomas. Reared, during his formative years, in the greater Philadelphia area, he was educated in his community's public schools, and then chose to pursue the trade of carpentry during his teen years.

In 1860, Thomas apprenticed with master carpenter Franklin Ashley in Oxford, Pennsylvania, and also resided with Ashley and his family at this time.

Civil War
A resident of Chester County at the dawn of the American Civil War, Hampton S. Thomas became one of Pennsylvania's earliest responders to President Abraham Lincoln's call for volunteers to help defend Washington, D.C. following the mid-April 1861 fall of Fort Sumter to troops from the Confederate States Army. Enrolling for military service on April 21 at the age of 23 in West Chester, Pennsylvania, Thomas then officially mustered in for duty the next day at Harrisburg as a third corporal with Company E of the 9th Pennsylvania Infantry. Following the completion of his Three Months' Service, he was honorably discharged with his regiment on July 29.

 Two days later, Thomas re-enlisted. Enrolling this time for a three-year term at Harrisburg on July 31, he mustered in at Camp Curtin on August 1, and was commissioned as a second lieutenant with Company G of the 1st Pennsylvania Cavalry that same day. Transported to the Eastern theater of battle, he and his regiment were then attached to the U.S. Army of the Potomac. On September 27, he was recommissioned as a first lieutenant. Engaged with his regiment in skirmishing near Dranesville, Virginia on November 26, Thomas and his fellow 1st Cavalrymen received their first taste of combat while supporting a Union artillery battery during the Battle of Dranesville on December 20. Assigned to scouting and defensive duties during the spring of 1862, they patrolled the areas around Catlett's Station, the Orange and Alexandria Railroad, Warrenton, and Rappahannock Station. Appointed in April 1862 as assistant adjutant-general of the 1st Brigade under his former regimental commander, George Dashiell Bayard, who had been commissioned as Chief of Cavalry of III Corps (Union Army), Thomas and his men captured the town of Falmouth after chasing off the enemy during an early morning charge on April 18. As a result of their success, Bayard was commissioned as brigadier-general of U.S. Volunteers on April 28, and Thomas was commissioned as a captain on May 5, and placed in charge of Company M. He and his men were then assigned to picket and scout details south of Fredericksburg, and advance guard and scouting details which supported the movements of Union Army commanding generals Irvin McDowell and George B. McClellan that spring and early summer. Crossing the Shenandoah River, they then helped to cut off the movements of Confederate General Stonewall Jackson's men near Strasburg, and supported Pennsylvania's "Bucktails" in their fight against CSA troops near Harrisonburg on June 6 before moving on to Port Republic. Standing in readiness, they next witnessed but did not engage in the Battle of Cross Keys (June 8). Assigned again to picket and scout duties, their next combat engagements came in the Battle of Cedar Mountain (August 8), First Battle of Rappahannock Station (August 20–25), and the Second Battle of Bull Run (August 28–30). Engaged next in the defense of Washington, D.C., Thomas and his men then resumed duties in support of McClellan's troops, engaging with the enemy in minor skirmishes and major charges throughout the fall. During the Battle of Fredericksburg (December 11–15), they suffered heavily under intense fire from enemy artillery and infantry, losing a number of their current and former members, including Bayard who asked, after being mortally wounded, that David McMurtrie Gregg be placed in command of the brigade.

Appointed by Brigadier General Gregg as an inspector-general on the staff of the 1st Brigade on April 1, 1863, Thomas participated with the brigade in Stoneman's 1863 raid and then, that summer, led his 1st Pennsylvania Cavalrymen and two companies of the 1st Maryland Cavalry in the recapture of Union artillery at Fleetwood Hill during the Battle of Brandy Station, Virginia on June 9 as Union forces engaged those of Confederate General J.E.B. Stuart. In a memoir penned in 1889, Thomas recalled what happened that day:

 On June 17, Thomas fought with his brigade in the Battle of Aldie, driving Confederate cavalrymen into and, over the next several days, beyond Middleburg. They then clashed again in the Battle of Upperville, and attacked the rear of Stuart's army near Westminster (June 30) before heading for Manchester, Hanover Junction, and on into Adams County, Pennsylvania. While fighting with his regiment in day three of the Battle of Gettysburg, Pennsylvania on July 3, 1863, Thomas led a charge of Union men on the left side of 12,500 Confederate cavalrymen and infantry troops, engaging in a "hacking" battle with the enemy and helping to inspire the CSA to retreat, according to historians Edward Longacre and Thomas Holbrook. Recalling the day's events in his 1889 memoir, Thomas noted that:

 After multiple subsequent charges, according to Thomas, the Confederate cavalrymen were forced into retreat. Assigned to picket duties the next day, Thomas and his troops were then ordered to pursue the retreating Confederate Army into Maryland and Virginia. After Thomas and his regiment re-engaged with the enemy near Shepherdstown (July 15) and in the Battle of Culpeper Court House (September 13), he was detailed to oversee the federal elections voting in early October by members of the 6th Ohio Cavalry. He was then hospitalized for three months after being wounded severely during the Battle of Bristoe Station (October 14). His first major engagement, after returning from his convalescence in 1864, was the Battle of Todd's Tavern (May 7, 1864). Attached again to brigade staff of Henry Eugene Davies, he led his men in a cavalry charge on the enemy to rescue Davies and two of his officers that day after they had been captured. Thomas and his men were then assigned with their brigade to the Union's Overland Campaign, fighting in the Battle of Yellow Tavern (May 11), a key engagement in which Confederate general J.E.B. Stuart was mortally wounded, and then under Major-General Philip H. Sheridan during his raid on Richmond. After rejoining the Army of the Potomac later in May, they then fought in the battles of Haw's Shop (May 28), Cold Harbor (May 31 – June 12), Trevilian Station (June 11–12), and Saint Mary's Church (June 24). During the Second Battle of Ream's Station (August 25), Thomas was severely injured again, this time during a fall as his horse was shot and killed. While he was recuperating at home during a 30-day medical furlough, he received word that he would be transferred, effective September 18, 1864, to the artillery battery of his regiment's M Company. Also relieved of his brigade staff assignment, he resumed leadership duties with the 1st Pennsylvania Cavalry on October 1. His regiment then re-engaged with the enemy off and on for the remaining months of that year.

Commissioned as a major of the regiment on January 4, 1865, Thomas next led his men on a mission in early March to rid the Blackwater Swamp area of unaffiliated highwaymen who had murdered Union soldiers while they were on picket duty. That assignment completed, he reported to City Point, per Sheridan's order, to assume command of a newly formed cavalry unit, and then led his men in the battles of Dinwiddie Court House (March 31) and Five Forks (April 1) and in operations along the South Side Railroad as part of the Third Battle of Petersburg (April 2).

Having previously been brevetted as a lieutenant colonel for his meritorious service, Thomas was then brevetted again on April 5, 1865, this time at the rank of colonel in recognition of his actions in combat that day during the Battle of Amelia Springs — actions which would also result in his being awarded the U.S. Medal of Honor. Recalling the events in his 1889 memoir, Thomas wrote:

Thomas and his men then reconnected with the Union's main command. When Sheridan and other officers came under sudden attack around 5 p.m. that afternoon while inspecting the enemy flags that had been captured earlier, Thomas and his men checked the Confederate attack, resorting to hand-to-hand combat with pistols and sabres in order to protect their own regimental colors. Once again, Thomas was grievously wounded when his horse was shot and killed. This time, however, Thomas was forced to undergo amputation of part of his leg (below the knee) when a Union Army surgeon determined that his leg bone had been shattered beyond repair by a carbine ball.

Transferred to the field and staff officers' corps of the 2nd Provisional Cavalry on June 17, 1865, after successfully recuperating from his injuries, Thomas then honorably mustered out with that regiment at Louisville, Kentucky on August 7, 1865.

Post-war life
Following his honorable discharge from the cavalry, Thomas returned home to the Philadelphia area, and found work as a coal dealer. Sometime around 1866, he and his wife, Sallie, welcomed the birth of a daughter, Mary, followed, respectively in 1868 and 1869, by daughter Lillian and son Philip. During the late 1860s and early 1870s, Thomas also served as the sergeant-at-arms of the Pennsylvania Senate; as the register of wills in West Chester (1874–1877), where he had resided since at least 1870; as the superintendent of the Philadelphia Almshouse (until 1880); as a collector of delinquent taxes; and then magistrate of the 28th district police court in Philadelphia. A member of the Masonic Lodge in Oxford, he was also active with the Grand Army of the Republic and the Republican Party.

He and his wife, Sallie, then welcomed the birth of another son, Bayerd G., in July 1888, who lived just eight weeks. In 1889, Thomas published accounts of his war-time activities. Entitled Some Personal Reminiscences of Service in the Cavalry of the Army of the Potomac, the first work was published in The United Service in January; the second was published later that year by L.R. Hamersly & Co., a Philadelphia-based publisher.

A resident of Philadelphia in 1895, Thomas was still serving as a magistrate in that city during the late 1890s. While conducting a hearing in the Manayunk Police Court on May 9, 1899, he suffered a severe episode of vertigo, the third such attack he had experienced. Taken to his home at 2532 Aspen Street, Thomas was diagnosed by his physician as terminal, and died at his home two weeks later on May 21, 1899. Following a military funeral on June 5, he was buried at Philadelphia's Monument Cemetery. When that cemetery was closed and the land sold during the 1950s, his remains were removed and reinterred at the Lawnview Memorial Park in Rockledge.

Medal of Honor citation

See also
 List of American Civil War Medal of Honor recipients: T–Z
 Pennsylvania in the Civil War

References

External links
 Thomas, Hampton S. Some Personal Reminiscences of Service in the Cavalry of the Army of the Potomac. Philadelphia, Pennsylvania: L.R. Hamersly, 1889.
 
 

1837 births
1899 deaths
American amputees
American Civil War recipients of the Medal of Honor
Burials at Lawnview Memorial Park
Burials at Monument Cemetery
People from Quakertown, Pennsylvania
People of Pennsylvania in the American Civil War
Union Army officers
United States Army Medal of Honor recipients